Paudie Clifford (Irish: Pádraig Ó Clúmháin) is an Irish Gaelic footballer. As of 2023, he is centre back and captain of Fossa, half forward for regional side East Kerry and at senior level for the Kerry county team. 
He is the brother of fellow Kerry footballer David Clifford.

Club
Clifford plays for the Fossa GAA club in County Kerry and for divisional side East Kerry GAA.

He won the 2016 Kerry Junior Football Championship with Fossa. He is also a two-time winner of the Kerry Senior Football Championship with East Kerry GAA.

Kerry

Junior
As a member of the Kerry junior team, Clifford won the 2018 All-Ireland Junior Football Championship and Munster Junior Football Championship.

2020
Clifford made his senior debut for Kerry in 2020.

2021
Kerry won the 2021 National League and the 2021 Munster Senior Football Championship.

He won his first All Star award at Centre Forward. He was also chosen on The Sunday Game Team of the Year.

2022
Clifford's Kerry team won every competition they entered in 2022. The 2022 McGrath Cup was followed with the 2022 National Football League and the 2022 Munster Senior Football Championship.

On 24 July, Kerry won the 2022 All-Ireland Senior Football Championship Final, giving the county their 38th title and Clifford his first.

He was chosen on The Sunday Game Team of the Year.

Third-level
During his time in third level college in Cork, Clifford lined out with both Cork Institute of Technology and University College Cork.

With UCC GAA, he was part of the college's 2019 Sigerson Cup winning side.

Career statistics
 As of match played 24 July 2022

Honours
Fossa
Kerry Premier Junior Football Championship (1): 2022 (c)
Munster Junior Club Football Championship (1): 2022 (c)
All-Ireland Junior Club Football Championship''' (1): 2023 (c)
Kerry Junior Football Championship (1): 2016

East Kerry
Kerry Senior Football Championship (3): 2019, 2020,2022

Kerry
 All-Ireland Senior Football Championship (1): 2022
 Munster Senior Football Championship (2): 2021, 2022
 All-Ireland Junior Football Championship (1): 2018
 Munster Junior Football Championship (1): 2018
 National Football League (2): 2021, 2022
 McGrath Cup: 2022

University College Cork
Sigerson Cup (1): 2019

Individual
All Star (2): 2021, 2022
The Sunday Game Team of the Year (2): 2021, 2022

References

Living people
All Stars Awards winners (football)
East Kerry Gaelic footballers
Fossa Gaelic footballers
Gaelic football forwards
Kerry inter-county Gaelic footballers
1996 births